Dirceu Lucas de Abreu Santos (born 25 February 1988), known as Lucas Abreu, is Brazilian footballer who plays for Paraná.

Biography
Born in Curvelo, Minas Gerais, Lucas started his career at Poços de Caldas of Campeonato Mineiro Módulo II. He signed a 3-year contract in January 2009. In July 2010, Gimnàstic announced the player was trailing at the club. After failing to secure a contract, he left for Ponte Preta in January 2011. on a -month contract.

References

External links

 

Brazilian footballers
Campeonato Brasileiro Série A players
Associação Atlética Ponte Preta players
Association football midfielders
Sportspeople from Minas Gerais
1988 births
Living people